Malvin is a naturally occurring chemical of the anthocyanin family.

Malvin reacts in the presence of H2O2 to form malvone. The ortho-benzoyloxyphenylacetic acid esters reaction product is dependant of the pH: it is obtained under acidic conditions whereas under neutral conditions, the reaction product is the 3-O-acyl-glucosyl-5-O-glucosyl-7-hydroxy coumarin.

Natural occurrences 
It is a diglucoside of malvidin mainly found as a pigment in herbs like Malva (Malva sylvestris), Primula and Rhododendron. M. sylvestris also contains malonylmalvin (malvidin 3-(6″-malonylglucoside)-5-glucoside).

The characteristic floral jade coloration of Strongylodon macrobotrys has been shown to be an example of copigmentation, a result of the presence of malvin and saponarin (a flavone glucoside) in the ratio 1:9.

Presence in food 
Malvin can be found in a variety of common foods, including:

Vegetables: avocado, beet, black-eyed pea, cabbage, carrot, eggplant, green pea, maize, olive (green and black), onion, pimento, potato, radish, tomato, turnip
Nuts: cashew, walnut
Herbs/Spices: paprika, mustard seed, cinnamon
Fruit: apple, fig, watermelon, rhubarb, strawberry, quince, peach (Clingstone variety), pear, plum, grape (red and green), apricot, banana, blackberry, blueberry, boysenberry, cherry, cranberry, black currant
Fish: crabmeat
Dairy: albumin (cow's milk), cheese, yogurt, butter
Sugar: sugar beet, honey

Malvin is not dangerous to ingest unless one develops an allergy toward it. An allergy to malvin may result in constipation, severe gas, vomiting or diarrhea when foods containing it are ingested in large amounts.

References 

O-methylated anthocyanins
Phenol ethers